

Alberta 

 Calgary City Hall
 Edmonton City Hall

British Columbia 

 Coquitlam City Hall
 Vancouver City Hall
 Victoria City Hall

Manitoba 

 Winnipeg City Hall

New Brunswick 

 Bathurst City Hall
 Campbellton City Hall
 Dieppe City Hall
 Edmundston City Hall
 Fredericton City Hall
 Miramichi City Hall
 Moncton City Hall
 Saint John City Hall

Newfoundland and Labrador 

 St. John's City Hall

Northwest Territories 

 Yellowknife City Hall

Nova Scotia 

 Halifax City Hall

Nunavut 

 Iqaluit City Hall

Ontario 

 Brampton - Brampton City Hall
 Brantford - Brantford City Hall
 Cornwall - Cornwall City Hall
 Greater Sudbury - Tom Davies Square
 Hamilton - Hamilton City Hall
 Kingston - Kingston City Hall
 Kitchener - Kitchener City Hall
 Markham - Markham Civic Centre
 Peterborough - Peterborough City Hall
 Mississauga - Mississauga Civic Centre
 North Bay City Hall
 Sault Ste. Marie City Hall
 Ottawa - Ottawa City Hall (First City Hall (Ottawa), Second City Hall (Ottawa), Old City Hall (Ottawa), Transportation Building (Ottawa))
 Stouffville, Ontario - old Stouffville Town Hall
 Timmins - Timmins City Hall
 Toronto - Toronto City Hall (Old City Hall (Toronto), Etobicoke Civic Centre, North York Civic Centre, Scarborough Civic Centre, St. Lawrence Market, Yorkville Town Hall)
 Ingersoll - Ingersoll Town Hall

Prince Edward Island 

 Charlottetown City Hall

Quebec 

 Bonsecours Market
 City Hall of Quebec City
 Montreal City Hall
 Rivière-du-Loup Town Hall
 Roberval Town Hall
 Saguenay City Hall
 Saint-Hyacinthe City Hall
 Shawinigan City Hall
 Sherbrooke City Hall
 Trois-Rivières City Hall
 Westmount City Hall

Saskatchewan 

 Regina City Hall
 Saskatoon City Hall

Yukon 

 Whitehorse City Hall

See also 

 List of city and town halls

City and town halls
Canada
Local government-related lists